Domitius may refer to:

Dometius of Persia, Christian saint, d. 300s
Dometius of Byzantium, Christian bishop, d. 200s
Saint Domitius, a French saint
Domitius Afer
Domitius Alexander
Domitius Domitianus
Gnaeus Domitius Corbulo
Domitius Modestus
Gnaeus Domitius Ahenobarbus (father of Nero)
Domitius Marsus, poet
 Domitius, a minor Roman god and one of the indigitamenta
 Domitius (spider), a genus of scaffold web spiders
Domitia gens, an ancient Roman family